Gran La Plata (Greater La Plata) is an urban agglomeration formed around the city of La Plata, in Buenos Aires Province, Argentina. It includes the La Plata, Berisso and Ensenada partidos (departments).

Location

Gran La Plata is located to the south of the Greater Buenos Aires agglomeration next to Rio de La Plata. To a small extent, the two metropolitan areas have slowly begun to merge. Nevertheless, the main centres remain separated by two dense forest reserves: the "Punta Lara jungle" ("Selva marginal") by the River Plate, and the "Pereyra Iraola Park" ("Parque Pereyra Iraola") a few kilometers inland.

History

The cities of Berisso and Ensenada existed well before La Plata and were both candidates to become the capital city of Buenos Aires Province once Buenos Aires city was federalized in 1880. Eventually, it was decided to build a new city, La Plata, entirely designed to serve as the provincial capital. It was founded in 1882. Soon after, irregular suburbs began to appear outside the designed limits of La Plata. These suburbs would go on to become an integral part of La Plata Partido municipality. Neighboring Berisso and Ensenada, on the Río de la Plata shore, acted from then on as natural harbors for the new capital city of the Province, and gradually they also became integrated as a conurbation into Greater La Plata.

Population

Notes

Metropolitan areas of Argentina
La Plata